Casimir Loxsom (born March 17, 1991) is a retired American middle distance runner who specialized in the 800 metres. In addition to attending and running at Pennsylvania State University, Loxsom has represented the United States in international competition. Loxsom ran professionally for Brooks Beasts Track Club from 2013 until his retirement in 2018.

Running career

High school
Loxsom attended Wilbur Cross High School, where he ran track and specialized in middle-distance running. In his senior year of high school, he ran his high school personal best in the 800 meters in 1:50.45 (min:sec) on May 9, 2009.

International and collegiate
At the 2010 World Junior Championships in Athletics in Moncton, Canada, Loxsom won a silver medal over 800 metres, becoming (along with bronze medalist Robby Andrews) the first American males to medal in a middle distance event at the world junior championships. Loxsom finished fourth in the final round of the men's 800-meter race at the 2011 Summer Universiade. At the 2012 NACAC U23 Championships, he finished in third overall in the 800 meters. Running for Penn State, Loxsom finished second in the 800 meters at the 2013 NCAA D1 Outdoor T&F Championships.

Professional
In Loxsom's first season as a professional with the Brooks Beasts TC he won three 800 meter races, Payton Jordan Invitational, Adrian Martinez Classic and Portland Track Festival. In the 2014 United States Track and Field Outdoor Championships, Loxsom finished second in the 800 meter final. Casimir finished 9th 2014 USA Indoor Track and Field Championships in 1:49.05.

In Loxsom's second full season with Brooks, Casimir won 600 meters in 1:15.33 an American Record at 2015 USA Indoor Track and Field Championships. Casimir finished 3rd in the 800 meters at 2015 USA Outdoor Track and Field Championships. On August 22, Loxsom finished 38th in the heats 2015 World Championships in Athletics – Men's 800 metres.

In 2017, Loxsom set a new world best in the indoor 600m event with a time of 1:14.91. Isaiah Harris, who finished second in that race, also beat the existing world's best with a time of 1:14.96. Interestingly, this race took place only a week after Emmanuel Korir had established the record of 1:14.97A, having surpassed Nico Motchebon's record of 1:15.12 from 1999.

Personal bests
.

Notable teammates
Ryan Foster

References

External links

Penn State Nittany Lions bio

1991 births
Living people
American male middle-distance runners
Penn State Nittany Lions men's track and field athletes
World Athletics Championships athletes for the United States
Sportspeople from New Haven, Connecticut
Track and field athletes from Connecticut
USA Indoor Track and Field Championships winners
Wilbur Cross High School alumni